This Town may refer to:

 "This Town" (O.A.R. song)
 "This Town" (Frank Sinatra song)
 "This Town" (Niall Horan song)
 "This Town" (Kygo song), featuring Sasha Sloan
 "This Town" (Roger Miller song), from The 3rd Time Around
 "This Town" (Go-Go's song), from Beauty and the Beat
 "This Town" (Orchestral Manoeuvres in the Dark song), from the B-side of "(Forever) Live and Die"
 This Town (album), by the Flying Emus (1987)
 This Town: Two Parties and a Funeral-Plus, Plenty of Valet Parking!-in America's Gilded Capital, a 2013 book by Mark Leibovich

See also
 "This Town Ain't Big Enough for Both of Us"
 Town (disambiguation)